Visa requirements for Egyptian citizens are administrative entry restrictions imposed on citizens of Egypt by the authorities of other states.

On 27 July 2022, Egyptian citizens had visa-free or visa on arrival access to 54 countries and territories, ranking the Egyptian passport 94th in terms of travel freedom according to the Henley Passport Index.

However, according to the most up-to-date list compiled on this wiki, Egyptian passport holders can enter 72 countries (not counting dependent and partially unrecognized territories) with Visa on arrival, or easy eVisas or complete visa free under certain conditions (See table and map below). In addition, several states have updated their rules recently to allow holders of valid Schengen/EU, UK, USA, Japan and Australia visa and residence permits to enter visa free under certain conditions, as listed below in the table.

Some countries require transit visas even if the Egyptian national remains airside (i.e. does not go through passport control). These include: Australia, Canada, New Zealand, the United States of America, the United Kingdom, and a minority of European states.



Visa requirements map

Visa requirements

Dependent, disputed, or restricted territories
Unrecognized or partially recognized countries

Dependent and autonomous territories

Non-visa restrictions

See also

Visa policy of Egypt
Egyptian passport

References and Notes
References

Notes

Egypt
Foreign relations of Egypt